Friedrich Wilhelm Jähns (2 January 1809 – 8 August 1888) was a German music scholar, voice teacher, and composer. He is best known for his chronological catalog of the works of Carl Maria von Weber.

Jähns was born and died in Berlin. His grave is preserved in the Protestant Friedhof I der Jerusalems- und Neuen Kirchengemeinde (Cemetery No. I of the congregations of Jerusalem's Church and New Church) in Berlin-Kreuzberg, south of Hallesches Tor.

See also
List of compositions by Carl Maria von Weber - a complete listing of the Jähns Catalogue

References

1809 births
1888 deaths
German Romantic composers
German music educators
Musicians from Berlin
19th-century classical composers
German male classical composers
19th-century German composers
19th-century German male musicians
19th-century German musicologists